Moscow Ring may refer to:
 Autodrom Moscow, a racing track near Moscow, Russia
 MKAD, a beltway encircling Moscow, Russia